800s may refer to:
 The period from 800 to 899, almost synonymous with the 9th century (801–900).
 The period from 800 to 809, known as the 800s decade, almost synonymous with the 81st decade (801-810).